A fish market is a marketplace for selling fish and fish products. It can be dedicated to wholesale trade between fishermen and fish merchants, or to the sale of seafood to individual consumers, or to both. Retail fish markets, a type of wet market, often sell street food as well.

Fish markets range in size from small fish stalls to large ones such as the great Tsukiji fish market in Tokyo, which turns over about 660,000 tonnes a year.

The term fish market can also refer to the process of fish marketing in general, but this article is concerned with physical marketplaces.


History and development

Fish markets were known in antiquity. They served as a public space where large numbers of people could gather and discuss current events and local politics.

Because seafood is quick to spoil, fish markets are historically most often found in seaside towns. Once ice or other simple cooling methods became available, some were also established in large inland cities that had good trade routes to the coast.

Since refrigeration and rapid transport became available in the 19th and 20th century, fish markets can technically be established at any place. However, because modern trade logistics in general has shifted away from marketplaces and towards retail outlets, such as supermarkets, most seafood worldwide is now sold to consumers through these venues, like most other foodstuffs.

Consequently, most major fish markets now mainly deal with wholesale trade, and the existing major fish retail markets continue to operate as much for traditional reasons as for commercial ones. Both types of fish markets are often tourist attractions as well.

Notable fish markets

The following is an incomplete list of notable fish markets. (See also a list of fish market articles.)

Operative markets
 Toyosu Market, Tokyo, Japan, the world's largest fish market, replacing the former Tsukiji Market, have at least the same capacity but in up-to-date infrastructure. It opened on 11 October 2018, 5 days after Tsukiji closure (for transfer purpose).
 La Nueva Viga Market, Mexico City, Mexico; the world's second largest fish market. Marketing from 250,000 up to 550,000 tons of seafood a year. 
 Sydney Fish Market, Sydney, Australia the world's third largest fish market for volume sold and second largest in terms of variety.
 Mercamadrid, Madrid, Spain; the world's fourth largest fish market, marketing about 220,000 tonnes a year.
 Billingsgate Fish Market, London, England, United Kingdom.
 Busan Cooperative Fish Market, Busan, South Korea.
 Feskekôrka, Gothenburg, Sweden.
 Fulton Fish Market, New York, United States.
 Pike Place Fish Market, Seattle, Washington, United States.
 Maine Avenue Fish Market, Washington, D.C., United States.
 Aberdeen Seafood Market, Aberdeen, Hong Kong Island, Hong Kong.
 Taipei Fish Market, Taipei, Taiwan.

Historical markets
Tsukiji fish market in Tokyo, Japan, was the world's largest fish market, marketing about 660,000 tonnes a year. It closed on 6 October 2018 after 83 years of operation, with most activities moving to the new Toyosu Market.
Scania Market, a historical annual market at the Falsterbo Peninsula
Huanan Seafood Wholesale Market in Wuhan, China. It closed down on 1 January 2020, when it gained worldwide attention after being identified as a possible point of origin of COVID-19 and the resulting pandemic.

See also

 Commercial fishing
 Fishmonger
 Fish products
 Fishwife
 History of fishing
 List of fish dishes
 List of seafood companies
 List of seafood dishes
 List of seafood restaurants
 Overfishing
 Wild fisheries

Notes

References
 Bellamy JC (1843) The housekeeper's guide to the fish-market for each month of the year Issue 33171 of Goldsmiths'-Kress library of economic literature, Longman, Brown, Green & Longmans.
 Bestor TC (2004) Tsukiji: the fish market at the center of the world In PE Lilienthal, California studies, Volume 11, University of California Press, .  See profile at Google Books
 Le Blanch J (2003) The Global fish market and the need for multilateral fishing disciplines In: Leonard B (ed) Overfishing: A Global Challenge, Diane Publishing, .
Paula Mónaco Felipe (April 11, 2008). "La Nueva Viga, paseo marino en el DF fuera de las guías turísticas" [La Nueva Viga, marine walk in the Federal District outside of tour guide books]. La Jornada (in Spanish) (Mexico City). Retrieved March 13, 2011.
 Crother C (2005) Catch!: A Fishmonger's Guide to Greatness Berrett-koehler Series, Berrett-Koehler Publishers, .
 Graddy K (2006) "The Fulton fish market" Journal of Economic Perspectives, 20(2): 207–220.
 Kirman, Alan P. and Vriend, Nicolaas J. (2000) "Learning to be loyal: A study of the Marseille fish market". In: Domenico Delli Gatti, Mauro Gallegati, Alan P. Kirman, Interaction and market structure: essays on heterogeneity in economics, Volume 484. Springer, .
 Maniatis GC (2000) "The Organizational Setup and Functioning of the Fish Market in Tenth-Century Constantinople" Dumbarton Oaks Papers, 54: 13–42. 
 Porcù Leide (2005) "Fishy business: Humor in a Sardinian fish market" International Journal of Humor Research, 18(1): 69–102. 
 Sophie S and Håkan H (2009) "Behind the fish market facade" The IMP Journal, 3(1): 50–74.
 Sancar Seckiner's new book DZ Uzerine Notlar, published Dec. 2014, highlights historic connection between two important fish markets in the world :Billingsgate-Yenikapı. .

External links 

 Fish out of water: A guide to city fishmongers New York Magazine, 10 April 1978.

 
Fisheries law
Retailers by type of merchandise sold